Robert Taylor is the name of:

Arts and entertainment

 Robert Taylor (American actor) (1911–1969), American actor 
 Robert Lewis Taylor (1912–1998), American novelist, The Travels of Jaimie McPheeters
 Robert N. Taylor (born 1945), singer of the neofolk duo Changes
 Robert R. Taylor (photographer) (1940–2013), Canadian wildlife photographer
 Robert Taylor (animator) (1944–2014), American animator; directed The Nine Lives of Fritz the Cat, TaleSpin and Heidi's Song
 Robert Taylor (architect) (1714–1788), English architect and sculptor
 Robert Taylor (Australian actor) (born 1963), Australian actor, Agent Jones in The Matrix
 Robert Taylor (painter) (born 1951), painter from Oklahoma
 Bob Taylor (DJ, producer), Romanian disc jockey
 Bob Taylor (luthier), American maker of acoustic guitars, principal of Taylor Guitars
 Bobby Taylor, leader of the Canadian soul band Bobby Taylor & the Vancouvers
 Detective Bob Taylor, the "Chief" investigator and semi-host of British TV series The Murder Game

Military
 Robert Taylor (British Army officer) (1760–1839), British general
 Robert B. Taylor (1774–1834), militia general and politician in Virginia
 Robert P. Taylor (1909–1997), American military officer and chaplain
 Bob Taylor (GC) (1920–1950), British recipient of the George Cross

Politics
 Robert Taylor (died 1696), Irish MP for Askeaton
 Robert Taylor (died 1723) (c. 1682–1723), Irish MP for Askeaton and Tralee
 Robert Taylor (congressman) (1763–1845), American politician
 Robert Taylor (Labour politician) (1881–1954), British Member of Parliament for Morpeth, 1935–1954
 Robert Taylor (Conservative politician) (1932–1981), Conservative MP for Croydon North West, South London, 1970–1981
 Robert Arthur Taylor (1886–1934), Member of Parliament for Lincoln, 1924–1931
 Robert Hobbs Taylor (1893–1947), Canadian physician and politician
 Robert Love Taylor (1850–1912), American politician
 Robert Paris Taylor (c. 1741–1792), Member of Parliament for Berwick-upon-Tweed, 1768–1774
 Rob Taylor (politician) (born 1971), member of the Iowa House of Representatives
 Bob Taylor (Ontario politician), mayor of Brantford, 1988–1991
 R. Cowles Taylor (1893–1955), mayor of Newport News, Virginia

Religion
 Robert Taylor (archdeacon of Lewes) (fl. 1558–1559)
 Robert Taylor (Radical) (1784–1844), English clergyman turned freethinker
 Robert Taylor (provost of Cumbrae) (1873–1944), Anglican priest and author
 Robert Selby Taylor (1909–1995), Anglican bishop
 Robert P. Taylor (1909–1997), American military officer and chaplain
 Robert V. Taylor (born 1958), first openly gay Episcopal dean in the United States

Sports

Association football
 Bob Taylor (footballer, born 1876) (1876–1919), English footballer
 Bob Taylor (footballer, born 1967), English footballer
 Robert Taylor (footballer, born 1971), English footballer
 Rob Taylor (footballer, born 1985), English footballer
 Robert Taylor (footballer, born 1994), Finnish footballer

Cricket
 Robert Taylor (cricketer, born 1873) (1873–?), English cricketer
 Bob Taylor (cricketer) (born 1941), English cricketer
 Robert Taylor (cricketer, born 1989), Scottish cricketer
 Robert Taylor (New Zealand cricketer) (1835–1901)

Gridiron football
 Robert Taylor (American football coach) (1940–2006), American football player and coach
 Rob Taylor (American football) (born 1960), American football player
 Bobby Taylor (American football) (born 1973), American football player
 Bobby Taylor (Canadian football) (born 1941), Canadian football player

Rugby
 Bob Taylor (rugby league), English rugby league footballer of the 1920s, and 1930s
 Robert Taylor (rugby league), rugby league footballer of the 1950s, and 1960s
 Bob Taylor (rugby union, born 1924) (1924–2015), Scottish rugby union international
 Bob Taylor (rugby union, born 1942), English rugby union international
 Robert Taylor (rugby union coach) (born 1980), Australian rugby union football coach

Other sports
 Bob Taylor (Australian footballer) (1931–2015), Australian rules footballer with Essendon
 Rob Taylor (Australian footballer) (1945–2015), Australian rules footballer for Footscray
 Bob Taylor (baseball) (born 1944), American baseball outfielder
 Bob Taylor (darts player) (born 1960), Scottish darts player
 Bob Taylor (ice hockey) (1901–1993), American professional ice hockey player
 Bobby Taylor (ice hockey) (born 1945), Canadian ice hockey player and broadcaster
 Robert Taylor (sprinter, born 1948) (1948–2007), American runner, 1972 Olympics gold medal winner in 4 × 100 m relay
 Robert Taylor (sprinter, born 1953), American runner, 1975 Pan American Games gold medal winner in 4 × 400 m relay

Other fields
 Robert Taylor (Australian businessman) (1792–1850), Englishman transported to New South Wales
 R. Fenwick Taylor (1849–1926), Florida Chief Justice
 Robert Taylor (mining engineer) (1855–1921), British mining engineer in India
 Robert Robinson Taylor (1868–1942), first African-American architect in the United States
 Robert Love Taylor (judge) (1899–1987), U.S. federal judge from Tennessee
 Robert Taylor (trade unionist) (1900–1986), Scottish trade union leader
 Robert H. Taylor (died 1985), American bibliophile
 Robert E. L. Taylor (1913–2009), publisher of the Philadelphia Bulletin
 Robert Saxton Taylor (1918–2009), librarian and information scientist
 Robert Taylor (1919–2007), forester involved in the Robert Taylor incident, an alleged 1979 UFO sighting and attempted alien abduction in West Lothian, Scotland
 Robert L. Taylor (aviator) (1924–2020), founder and president of the Antique Airplane Association
 Robert Taylor (computer scientist) (1932–2017), American computer scientist
 Robert Richard Taylor (1932–2008), British public administrator, airport manager and Royal Air Force officer
 Robert Rochon Taylor (1897–1957), American housing activist and banker
 Robert Wright Taylor, British solicitor

See also
 Robert Walker Tayler Sr. (1812–1878), American politician
 Robert Walker Tayler (1852–1910), American congressman and federal judge, son of the above